This list is concerned with Indonesian people of mixed ancestry. The context is considered at Indo people.

A 
 Abimana Aryasatya, actor (Spanish descent)
 Achintya Holte Nilsen, Winner of Miss Indonesia 2017 and Top 10 Miss World 2017 (Norwegian descent)
 Adjie Massaid, actor, model and politician (Dutch descent)
 Ahmad Dhani, musician (German descent)
 Alessandra Usman, model (Turkish descent)
 Alexandra Gottardo, actress (Italian descent)
 Alice Norin, actress and DJ (Norwegian descent)
 André Joseph Guillaume Henri Kostermans, botanist (Dutch descent)
 Anggika Bolsterli, actress (Swiss descent)
 Arifin Putra, actor (German descent)
 Asmirandah, actress, singer, writer and model (Dutch descent)

B 
 Barry Prima, actor (Dutch descent)
 Bryan Domani, actor and singer who was former vocalist of Super 7 (German descent)

C 
 Carissa Putri, actress (German and Dutch descent)
 Catherine Wilson, actress, model (British and Arab descent)
 Celia Thomas, actress (American descent)
 Chelsea Islan, actress (American descent)
 Chelsea Olivia Wijaya, actress and singer (American and Chinese descent)
 Christian Sugiono, actor, model (Indonesian-German)
 Cinta Laura Kiehl, actress, singer (German-Sundanese)

D 
 Darius Sinathriya, actor, model, sport presenter (Javanese father, Swiss mother)
 Dewi Rezer, actress, model (French-Betawi)
 Dewi Sandra, singer, actress, model (Welsh-Betawi)
 Diego Muhammad, footballer (Dutch-Moluccan)

E 
 Egy Maulana Vikri, footballer (Dutch-Indonesia)
 Elkan Baggott, footballer (English father, Indonesian mother)
 Ernest Douwes Dekker, politician (Dutch father, Javanese-German mother)

F 
 Fariz RM, musician (Dutch mother)
 Ferry Sonneville, badminton player
 Nino Fernandez (German father, Indonesian mother) actor, model, comedian
 Frans Mohede, singer and actor (Dutch-Moluccan-Sangirese)
 Franz Magnis-Suseno, Jesuit

G 
 Gading Marten, son of Roy Marten
 Gaspar da Costa
 Gavin Kwan Adsit, footballer (Chinese-Indonesian mother, American father)
 Mark-Paul Gosselaar

H 
 Kerenina Sunny Halim, Miss Indonesia, model (Indonesian father, American mother)
 Herman Neubronner van der Tuuk, translator and linguist
 Jesse Huta Galung, tennis player (Dutch-Batak)

I 
 Indra Lesmana, singer, musician, composer
 Irfan Bachdim, footballer (Indonesian-Arab father, Dutch mother)
 Irish Bella, actress, model (Indonesian mother, Belgium father)

J 
 Jack Alan Brown, Indonesian national footballer -- under 19 (English father, Indonesian mother)
 Jajang C. Noer, actress, film producer
 Jamie Aditya, musician, former video jockey
 Julie Estelle, actress
 Juwono Sudarsono, Indonesian Minister of Defense
 Jhon van Beukering, Indonesian footballer
 Jolene Marie, (Indonesian father, American mother)
 Jonas Rivanno, actor and singer
 José Abílio Osório Soares, Indonesian politician (Portuguese-East Timor)
 Joop Ave

K 
 Kim Kurniawan, footballer (Chinese-Indonesian father, German mother)

L 
 Laura Antonietta, actress, model (Indonesian-Italian)
 Leylarey Lesesne, actress (American French father, Indonesian mother)
 Laura Gemser
 Leonardus Benjamin Moerdani
 Loa Sek Hie, colonial politician, founder of Pao An Tui
 Luna Maya, model (Austria-Javanese)
 Lydia Kandou, actress, model (Dutch-Minahasan)

M 
 Manuel "Grubby" Schenkhuizen, Dutch professional gamer playing the real-time strategy games Warcraft III (WC3), Warcraft III: The Frozen Throne and Starcraft 2
 Marcel Chandrawinata, actor, model
 Mariana Renata, model (French-Italian-Javanese)
 Mark-Paul Gosselaar, actor
 Maxime Bouttier, actor (French-Indonesian)
 Maya Soetoro-Ng, half sister of Barack Obama
 Michelle Branch, singer, songwriter (Irish-Indonesian-Dutch)
 Meriam Bellina, singer, actress and model
 Mieke Wijaya, actress, singer
 Mimi Mariani, actress, model, and singer (Belgian-Dutch-Manado)
 Mira Lesmana, film director

N 
 Nadine Ames, actress and model (Welsh father, Javanese mother)
 Nadine Chandrawinata, model (Chinese-Javanese father, German mother)
 Nadya Hutagalung, model, former video jockey
 Nafa Urbach, singer, actress, model
 Nia Zulkarnaen, actress, former singer (Australian and Dutch descent)
 Nicholas Saputra, actor, model, video jockey

P 
 Pah Wongso, social worker (Dutch father)
 Petrus Josephus Zoetmulder, Indonesian Jesuit
 Pevita Pearce, actress, singer (English father, Banjarmasin mother)
 Pierre Coffin, French animator, film director, and voice actor (French father, Indonesian mother)
 Pierre Tendean, Indonesian National Hero (Minahasan father, Dutch-French mother)
 Pierre Roland, actor (French father, Indonesian mother)
 Poncke Princen, Indonesia politician

R 
 Radja Nainggolan, football player (Belgian-Batak)
 Raphael Maitimo, Indonesian footballer
 Rianti Cartwright, actress, model, presenter and VJ (British-Italy, Welsh father and Sundanese-Javanese mother)
 Roy Marten, actor (Indonesian father, Dutch mother)

S 
 Shae, singer, actress (Indonesian-Riau mother, Australian father)
 Sophia Latjuba, actress
 Suzzanna
 Sergio van Dijk, footballer
 Steven William, actor (Indonesian mother, American father)

T 
 Tamara Bleszynski, actress (Indonesian mother, Polish father)
 Tonnie Cusell, footballer

V 
 Alex Van Halen, drummer, co-founder of Van Halen (Dutch father, Indonesian mother)
 Eddie Van Halen, guitarist, co-founder of Van Halen (Dutch father, Indonesian mother)

Z 
 Zack Lee, actor and model (Indonesian-Chinese father, English mother)

Indo people
Indonesian people of European descent
Ethnic groups in Indonesia
INdos